YCU may refer to:

 Yokohama City University, Japan
 Yuncheng Guangong Airport (IATA code), Shanxi Province, China